Johan Nygaardsvolds plass is a town square in Oslo, Norway.

It is located between the offices of the Ministry of Finance, Høyblokka ("High Block"), and Y Block in Regjeringskvartalet. The square encompasses the Regjeringsparken ("The Government Park") with a water feature and an allée of trees. The square and park were designed by architect firm of Lunde & Løvseth.

The square is named after Prime Minister Johan Nygaardsvold (1879-1952) who was Prime Minister in Norway from 20 March 1935 to 25 June 1945 as the leader of Nygaardsvold's Cabinet.

No buildings have an address on this square.

Squares in Oslo